Vanesa Rakedzhyan (born 31 July 1976) is an Armenian alpine skier. She competed in two events at the 2002 Winter Olympics.

References

1976 births
Living people
Armenian female alpine skiers
Olympic alpine skiers of Armenia
Alpine skiers at the 2002 Winter Olympics
Sportspeople from Marseille
French people of Armenian descent